Whose Garden Was This is the third studio album by American singer-songwriter John Denver, consisting mainly of cover songs. It was released in October 1970.  This album was subsequently re-released as bonus tracks on re-releases of the albums John Denver and Spirit. British singer Dame Vera Lynn recorded the title song in 1972 for her album Unforgettable Songs by Vera Lynn. Actually, Vera Lynn was keen to sing the song on her BBC television show (1972) but felt the song was a little too short and asked Tom Paxton for a further verse to be added - and he duly obliged - with the 'forest/squirrels' one. Subsequently he often sang this later version in concert.

Track listing

Notes
 signifies adapted by

Personnel

Musicians
John Denver – guitar, vocals, arranger
Paul Griffin – keyboards
Russ Savakus – bass
Teddy Sommer – drums
David Spinozza – guitar
Mike Taylor – guitar

Production
John Crotty – recording engineer
Jean Goldhirsch – production assistant
Ray Hall – recording engineer
Milton Okun – producer, arranger, string arrangements

Design
Mark Ahlstrom – liner notes photography
David Hecht – cover photography
Joe Stelmach – album design

References

John Denver albums
1970 albums
Albums produced by Milt Okun
RCA Records albums